Luc is a surname. Notable persons with that name include:

 Giraut del Luc ( 1190–1197), French troubadour
 Jacques de Saint-Luc, (1616– 1710), Flemish lutenist and composer
 Jean-André de Luc (1727–1817), Swiss geologist and meteorologist
 Jeff Luc (born 1992), American football player
 Michel Luc (1927-2010), French zoologist
 Sylvain Luc (born 1965), French jazz guitarist

See also
 Luc (given name)
 Luc (disambiguation)

Surnames